Beit Tikvah is a modern orthodox synagogue located in the Nepean district of Ottawa, Ontario, Canada, serving the Craig Henry area.

History
The Jewish population of Ottawa grew from 20 families in 1889 to approximately 5,500 in 1961.

Beth Shalom
Beth Shalom congregation represents the amalgamation in 1956 of two orthodox congregations, Adath Jeshurun and Agudath Achim. B'nai Jacob congregation amalgamated with Beth Shalom in 1971. The First officials were Rabbi Simon L. Eckstein, Cantor Emeritus, Joseph Rabin, Cantor Hyman Gertler, Ritual Director Jacob Y. Cement, Secretary Louis Slack and President, Bernard M. Alexandor. The congregation commenced with 850 families, with about 150 being singles or widows. A synagogue, designed by Hazelgrove and Lithwick, was inaugurated on Rosh Hashana, 1956.

Beit Tikvah
Beit Tikvah, also known as CBTO, was established in 1985 as Beth Shalom West, a satellite synagogue of Beth Shalom, Ottawa located in the Craig Henry area of Ottawa. After a groundbreaking ceremony held on September 9, 1984, construction commenced on land donated by Jack and Irving Aaron. The synagogue officially opened for Shabbat services on September 11, 1985. Rabbi Gershon Sonnenschein became the first full-time rabbi in 1989, followed by Rabbi Howard Finkelstein, on August 8, 1991, until present.

Jewish Memorial Gardens
As of 1 July 2008, each of the Founding Members: Congregation Machzikei Hadas; Congregation Beth Shalom; Agudath Israel (Ottawa); the Jewish Reform Congregation Temple Israel (Ottawa); Young Israel of Ottawa; Congregation Beit Tikvah of Ottawa transferred to Jewish Memorial Gardens the cemetery lands that they had.

Rabbi Howard Finkelstein
Rabbi Howard Finkelstein is married to Rivka Finkelstein and they moved to Ottawa in 1991. He has been the Rabbi of CBTO (formerly Beth Shalom West) for 28 years and was previously the Rabbi at Kingston's Beth Israel Synagogue for 12 years. While in Ottawa, Rabbi Finkelstein was a teacher at Yitzhak Rabin High School (1995-2015) as well as the Dean of Judaic studies at the Ottawa Jewish Community School (2015–present). When retired, he and his wife plan on moving to Israel.

Retirement Party
On June 3, 2019, CBTO hosted a retirement party for Rabbi Finkelstein. Many people spoke their words of appreciation towards the Rabbi and Rivka which included Bobby Wollock, the shul's president and a previous student to Rabbi Finkelstein. Towards the end of the evening, Bobby presented Rabbi Finkelstein with a plaque and personal words of appreciation. Afterwards, the Rabbi delivered a moving speech thanking the community for being a strong partner in the shul's material and spiritual growth, even calling the congregation "family".

References

https://www.facebook.com/Congregation-Beit-Tikvah-of-Ottawa-293146260834828/

Jews and Judaism in Ottawa
Synagogues in Ottawa
Buildings and structures in Ottawa
Orthodox synagogues in Canada
1985 establishments in Ontario
Jewish organizations established in 1985